Stour Wood is a woodland in Essex, England, near the village of Wrabness. It is owned by the Woodland Trust, and managed by the Royal Society for the Protection of Birds. It is part of the Stour and Copperas Woods, Ramsey Site of Special Scientific Importance.

References

Sites of Special Scientific Interest in Essex
Royal Society for the Protection of Birds
Woodland Trust